Ranmith Jayasena (born 8 April 2000) is a Sri Lankan cricketer. He made his Twenty20 debut on 4 January 2020, for Tamil Union Cricket and Athletic Club in the 2019–20 SLC Twenty20 Tournament. He made his List A debut on 30 March 2021, for Tamil Union Cricket and Athletic Club in the 2020–21 Major Clubs Limited Over Tournament.

References

External links
 

2000 births
Living people
Sri Lankan cricketers
Kalutara Town Club cricketers
Tamil Union Cricket and Athletic Club cricketers
Place of birth missing (living people)